Ricardo Castillo may refer to:
Ricardo Castillo (boxer) (b. 1979), Mexican boxer
Ricardo Castillo (composer) (1891–1966), Guatemalan composer